The Tasman Sea (Māori: Te Tai-o-Rēhua) is a marginal sea of the South Pacific Ocean, situated between Australia and New Zealand. The sea was named after the Dutch explorer Abel Janszoon Tasman, who in 1642 was the first known person to cross it. British explorer Lieutenant James Cook later extensively navigated the Tasman Sea in the 1770s during his three voyages of exploration.

The Tasman Sea is informally referred to in both Australian and New Zealand English as the Ditch; for example, "crossing the Ditch" means travelling to Australia from New Zealand, or vice versa. The diminutive term "the Ditch" used for the Tasman Sea is comparable to referring to the North Atlantic Ocean as "the Pond".

Climate
The south of the sea is passed over by depressions going from west to east. The northern limit of these westerly winds is near to 40°S. During the southern winter, from April to October, the northern branch of these winds from the west changes its direction toward the north and goes up against trade winds. Hence, the sea receives frequent winds from the southwest during this period. In the Australian summer (from November to March), the southern branch of the trade winds goes up against west winds and produces further wind activity in the area.

Geography
The base of the sea is made up of globigerina ooze. A small zone of pteropod ooze is found to the south of New Caledonia and to the southern extent of 30°S, siliceous ooze can be found.

Extent
The International Hydrographic Organization defines the limits of the Tasman Sea as:

Ridge

The Tasman Sea's midocean ridge developed between 85 and 55 million years ago as Australia and Zealandia broke apart during the breakup of supercontinent Gondwana. It lies roughly midway between the continental margins of Australia and Zealandia. Much of Zealandia is submerged, so the ridge runs much closer to the Australian coast than New Zealand's.

Islands
The Tasman Sea features a number of midsea island groups, quite apart from coastal islands located near the Australian and New Zealand mainlands:
 Lord Howe Island (part of New South Wales)
 Ball's Pyramid (part of New South Wales)

Adjoining bodies of water
 North: Coral Sea
 Northeast and East: Pacific Ocean
 East: Cook Strait
 South and southeast: Southern Ocean
 West: Bass Strait

Animal and plant life
A deep-sea research ship, the RV Tangaroa, explored the sea and found 500 species of fish and 1300 species of invertebrates. The tooth of a megalodon, an extinct shark, was also found by researchers.

History

In 1876, the first telegraph cable connecting Australia and New Zealand was lain in the Tasman Sea. Moncrieff and Hood were the first to attempt a trans-Tasman crossing by plane in 1928. The first successful flight over the sea was accomplished by Charles Kingsford Smith and Charles Ulm later that year. The first person to row solo across the sea was Colin Quincey in 1977. The next successful solo crossing was completed by his son, Shaun Quincey, in 2010.

See also

 Axis naval activity in New Zealand waters
 List of seas

References

Further reading

External links

 
Coastline of New Zealand
Marginal seas of the Pacific Ocean
Australia–New Zealand border
Coastline of Australia
Bodies of water of Australia
Bodies of water of New Zealand
Seas of Oceania